The Epiponini (formerly known as Polybiini) are a large and diverse tribe of social wasps inhabiting the Neotropical region, with some species' ranges extending into the Nearctic region.

Selected species
 Apoica pallens
 Leipomeles dorsata
 Parachartergus apicalis
 Parachartergus colobopterus
 Polybia sericea
 Protopolybia exigua
 Synoeca cyanea
 Brachygastra mellifica

Vespidae